Maurizio Danielli (23 May 1949 – 22 December 2016) was an Italian rower. He competed in the men's eight event at the 1972 Summer Olympics. He died on 22 December 2016.

References

1949 births
2016 deaths
Italian male rowers
Olympic rowers of Italy
Rowers at the 1972 Summer Olympics
Place of birth missing